Syrnola tincta, common name the dyed pyramid shell,  is a species of sea snail, a marine gastropod mollusk in the family Pyramidellidae, the pyrams and their allies.

Description
The length of the shell of this ectoparasite measures 5 mm.

Distribution
This marine species occurs off New South Wales, Victoria, South Australia and Tasmania.

References

External links
 To World Register of Marine Species
 A guide to the seashells and other marine mollusks of Tasmania: Syrnola tincta

Pyramidellidae
Gastropods described in 1871